C'mon Everybody is a compilation album by American singer and musician Elvis Presley released by RCA Records on July 1, 1971. The album was certified Gold on January 6, 2004 by the Recording Industry Association of America.

Content
All tracks from C'Mon Everybody originated from four of Elvis's films and were only released on soundtrack EP's prior to this issue.   The remaining EP tracks from the same four movies were compiled into another budget RCA Camden album, I Got Lucky, released three months later. All ten tracks are monaural recordings.

Track listing

References

External links

C'mon Everybody - Sergent.com.au

Elvis Presley compilation albums
1971 compilation albums
RCA Records compilation albums
Albums produced by Georgie Stoll
Albums produced by Hans J. Salter
Albums produced by Jeff Alexander